Jürgen Oberschelp (born 12 July 1938) is a German conductor, choir director. He conducted the Bielefelder Kinderchor, a mixed children's choir that his father had founded in 1932, from 1984 to 2016.

Life 
Oberschelp was born in Bielefeld. After studying musicology, geography and music education in Cologne, Mainz and Vienna, Oberschelp received his doctorate in 1972 in Cologne with the dissertation Das öffentliche Musikleben der Stadt Bielefeld im 19. Jahrhundert, about public musical life in Bielefeld in the 19th century. He taught music and geography at the Max-Planck-Gymnasium in Bielefeld from 1971 to 2002, when he retired as Oberstudienrat.

In the 1960s, he took over the direction of the Bielefelder Kinderchor, which his father Friedrich Oberschelp had founded in 1932 as the first mixed children's choir in Germany. He organised many concerts and toured in Germany and abroad. He retired in 2016.

Publications 
 Das öffentliche Musikleben der Stadt Bielefeld im 19. Jahrhundert. Bosse, Regensburg 1972 (zugleich: Köln, Univ., Philos. Fak., Diss. 1972); 
 Das Verschwinden der Kunst in der "Kunst des Zitats". Versuch über Popästhetik in den 80er Jahren. Univ., Diss., Bielefeld 1991

Recordings 
As choral conductor with the Bielefelder Kinderchor:
 Lieder zur Winter- und Weihnachtszeit. Ariola-Eurodisc, Gütersloh / Munich 1980
 Jetzt kommen die lustigen Tage. Ariola-Eurodisc, Gütersloh / Munich 1980
 Die schönsten europäischen Volkslieder. Ariola-Eurodisc, Gütersloh / Munich 1981
 Das grosse Jubiläumskonzert. 50 Jahre Bielefelder Kinderchor. Ariola-Eurodisc, Gütersloh / Munich 1982
 75 Jahre Bielefelder Kinderchor

References

External links 
 
 

German conductors (music)
German choral conductors
1938 births
Living people
Musicians from Bielefeld